Coleophora bornicensis is a moth of the family Coleophoridae. It is found in Germany and Turkey.

The larvae feed on the flowers of Tanacetum vulgare.

References

bornicensis
Moths of Europe
Moths of Asia